Johnny Klimek (born 18 August 1962) is an Australian musician, music producer, and composer, best known for his innovative work in the underground electronica music scene and for his film scores.

Life and career 
Klimek was born in Melbourne, Australia. His mother, Luisa née Cester (born 29 January 1916 in Pasiano di Pordenone) was a daughter of the couple Eugenia and Ernesto Cester. In the Summer of 1940 she left Friuli-Venezia Giulia for Australia. After the Second World War, she married Alfons Klimek (died 1998) and gave birth to eight children: Eugenia, Lydia, Naomi (born 1953), Greta, Alfons junior, Robert, and twins Jayney and Johnny (born August 1962).  Her sister, Fanny Cester, emigrated to Australia in 1937 and married racing cyclist Nino Borsari in 1940. The Klimek family lived in various Melbourne suburbs including Kew, Oakleigh and, from 1969, Clayton. Klimek's younger cousins, Nic and Chris Cester, were founding mainstays of Australian hard rocker band, Jet (2001–12).

Johnny worked in a number of local garage bands before emigrating to Berlin in 1983, where he started the pop rock band The Other Ones with his sister Jayney and brother Alf. He became active in the Berlin underground trance/ambient/techno scene, and collaborated with Paul Browse of the band Clock DVA on a short-lived musical project, Effective Force. He served as the bass player for singer Nina Hagen's 1996 tour.

Klimek has produced numerous film scores with composer Reinhold Heil, beginning with the 1997 film Winter Sleepers. Since then, they have become regular collaborators of its director, Tom Tykwer, and have provided the score to almost all of his films since, including the score to Perfume, Story Of A Murderer. Klimek, Heil, and Tykwer were nominated for a Golden Globe Award for Best Original Score for their critically acclaimed score to the latter's 2012 epic science fiction film Cloud Atlas. He has also worked on television series such as Without a Trace, Deadwood, The Newsroom, and Sense8, thriller films such as Run Lola Run and One Hour Photo, horror films such as Land of the Dead and Blood & Chocolate, and action films like Killer Elite and I, Frankenstein. He has won 5 ASCAP Awards, and has been nominated for 2 Saturn Awards, and for 1 Primetime Emmy Award.

Filmography

Feature films

Television

References

External links 
 
 

1962 births
ASCAP composers and authors
Australian composers
Australian film score composers
Australian male composers
Australian record producers
Living people
Male film score composers
Male television composers
Musicians from Melbourne